Run of 1889 is an outdoor 1955 relief by Laura Gardin Fraser, installed in Oklahoma City's Bicentennial Park, in the U.S. state of Oklahoma. The  sculpture commemorates pioneers of the Land Rush of 1889 and depicts more than 250 horses and riders. It is part of the City of Oklahoma City Public Art collection and was renovated in 2012.

See also

 1955 in art
 Horses in art

References

External links
 Run of 1889 - Bicentennial Park - Oklahoma City, Oklahoma USA at Waymarking

1955 establishments in Oklahoma
1955 sculptures
Horses in art
Monuments and memorials in Oklahoma
Outdoor sculptures in Oklahoma City
Reliefs in the United States